The 1950 Drexel Dragons football team represented the Drexel Institute of Technology (renamed Drexel University in 1970) as an independent during the 1950 college football season.  Eddie Allen was the team's head coach.

Tackle Tom Staszak was awarded second team on the 1950 Little All-America college football team.

Schedule

Roster

References

Drexel
Drexel Dragons football seasons
Drexel Dragons football